Bryce Douvier (born 1 December 1991) is an American-Austrian professional basketball player for Vanoli Cremona of the Italian Serie A2. He also represented the Austria national team during the 2019 FIBA World Cup qualifiers.

References

External links
 WIN-Basketball.com profile
 Real GM profile
 ESPN profile

1991 births
Living people
American men's basketball players
Aris B.C. players
Austrian men's basketball players
BC Šiauliai players
Blu Basket 1971 players
Forwards (basketball)
MKS Dąbrowa Górnicza (basketball) players
Ovarense Basquetebol players
Oviedo CB players
Sportspeople from Salzburg
Texas A&M–Corpus Christi Islanders men's basketball players
UJAP Quimper 29 players